"Feel Good" was announced as the second promo single from G-Unit's second studio album, Terminate on Sight which was produced by Teddy Becks.

Background
The track premiered on November 1, 2007 and will be included on an upcoming G-Unit album

When asked about the song in an interview, 50 Cent said:

Music video
The video was released to the internet first because of the graphical content.

A second video for the track was released.

References

External links
G-Unit - Feel Good at YouTube
G-Unit - Feel Good (Dirty) at YouTube

G-Unit songs
2007 singles
Songs written by 50 Cent
2007 songs
Songs written by Lloyd Banks
Songs written by Young Buck
G-Unit Records singles
Songs written by Tony Yayo